Flight 823 may refer to

Northeast Airlines Flight 823, crashed on 1 February 1957
KLM Flight 823, crashed on 12 June 1961
United Airlines Flight 823, had an uncontrollable fire on 9 July 1964

0823